Da Silvano was an Italian restaurant in the New York City borough of Manhattan's West Village neighborhood known for its celebrity clientele and gregarious owner Silvano Marchetto. The eatery opened in 1975 and shut its doors in December 2016 some 41 odd years later.  Jack Nicholson and Leo Castelli ate there once.

Of owner Silvano Marchetto, Frank Bruni stated in a 2006 review of the establishment..."Da Silvano, which received two stars in The New York Times from Ruth Reichl in 1998, has been around for more than three decades,"....."Over that time it has evolved from a trailblazing showcase for unadorned Tuscan cooking to something of a downtown Elaine's with a proprietor, Silvano Marchetto, practiced at coddling stars and manufacturing his own luster."....

References 

Restaurants in Manhattan
Restaurants established in 1975
2016 disestablishments in New York (state)
Defunct Italian restaurants in New York City